A carbuncle is an abscess larger than a boil, usually with one or more openings draining pus onto the skin.

Carbuncle may also refer to:
 Carbuncle (gemstone), a deep-red cabochon cut gemstone usually garnet, specifically almandine
 Carbuncle (heraldry), a charge or bearing, consisting of eight radii, or spokes; four of which make a common cross, and the other four a saltire
 Carbuncle (legendary creature), a legendary creature in South American folklore that is associated with gemstones
 The Carbuncle, a small island off Port Sorell, Tasmania, Australia
 Carbuncle Hill Archaeological District, RI-1072-1079, a historic district in Coventry, Rhode Island
 Carbuncle, a character in the Puyo Puyo series
 Carbuncle, a summoned creature in Final Fantasy

See also
 "The Adventure of the Blue Carbuncle", a Sherlock Holmes short story by Sir Arthur Conan Doyle
 The Carbuncle Awards, presented to buildings and areas in Scotland intermittently since 2000
 Carbuncle Cup, an annual architectural award for the ugliest new building in the United Kingdom
 "The Great Carbuncle", a short story by Nathaniel Hawthorne
 Monstrous carbuncle, a pejorative term coined by Charles III for ugly architecture

it:Carbuncle